Russell Van Hout (born 15 June 1976) is an Australian former racing cyclist. He won the Australian national road race title in 2006. He also rode in the 2004 and 2005 Giro d'Italia and won a stage of the 2006 Tour Down Under.

Major results

2001
 3rd Time trial, National Road Championships
2002
 1st Overall National Road Series
 1st Overall Canberra Tour
 2nd Overall Tour of Tasmania
1st Stages 1 & 6
2003
 1st Prologue Tour of Greece
2004
 4th Overall Tour of Queensland
 4th Melbourne to Warrnambool Classic
2005
 1st Stage 1 (TTT) Herald Sun Tour
 3rd Time trial, National Road Championships
2006
 National Road Championships
1st  Road race
4th Time trial
 7th Overall Tour Down Under
1st Stage 4
2010
 4th Road race, National Road Championships

References

External links

1976 births
Living people
Australian male cyclists
Cyclists from Adelaide